China competed at the 2014 Winter Olympics in Sochi, Russia, from 7–23 February 2014.

The 2014 Games marked the first time a Chinese Olympic team competed in Russia, as China and 64 western countries did not take part at the American-led boycott in the 1980 Summer Olympics held in Moscow due to the Soviet–Afghan War.

Medalists

Alpine skiing 

According to the quota allocation released on January 20, 2014, China had two athletes in qualification position.

Biathlon 

Based on their performance at the 2012 and 2013 Biathlon World Championships, China qualified 1 man and 4 women.

Cross-country skiing 

According to the quota allocation released on January 20, 2014, China had qualified a total quota of four athletes.

Distance

Sprint

Curling

Based on results from the 2012 World Men's Curling Championship and the 2013 World Men's Curling Championship, China had qualified their men's team as one of the seven highest ranked nations. The Women's team managed to qualify by winning the last chance qualifying event in December 2013.
The men's team consisted of Liu Rui, Xu Xiaoming, Ba Dexin, Zang Jialiang, and Zou Dejia. The women's team consisted of the defending bronze medalists Wang Bingyu, Liu Yin, Yue Qingshuang, Zhou Yan, and new alternate Jiang Yilun.

Men's tournament

Round-robin
China had a bye in draws 2, 6, and 10.

Draw 1
Monday, February 10, 9:00 am

Draw 3
Tuesday, February 11, 2:00 pm

Draw 4
Wednesday, February 12, 9:00 am

Draw 5
Wednesday, February 12, 7:00 pm

Draw 7
Friday, February 14, 9:00 am

Draw 8
Friday, February 14, 7:00 pm

Draw 9
Saturday, February 15, 2:00 pm

Draw 11
Sunday, February 16, 7:00 pm

Draw 12
Monday, February 17, 2:00 pm

Women's tournament

Round-robin
China had a bye in draws 2, 6, and 10.

Draw 1
Monday, February 10, 2:00 pm

Draw 3
Tuesday, February 11, 7:00 pm

Draw 4
Wednesday, February 12, 2:00 pm

Draw 5
Thursday, February 13, 9:00 am

Draw 7
Friday, February 14, 2:00 pm

Draw 8
Saturday, February 15, 9:00 am

Draw 9
Saturday, February 15, 7:00 pm

Draw 11
Monday, February 17, 9:00 am

Draw 12
Monday, February 17, 7:00 pm

Figure skating 

China had achieved the following quota places: The team consisted of eight athletes. The team had also qualified for the team trophy.

Team trophy

Freestyle skiing 

China had qualified nine quota spots for the following events. The full list of Chinese freestyle skiing team was officially announced on January 26, 2014.

Aerials

Moguls

Short track speed skating 

China qualified five skaters of each gender for the Olympics during World Cup 3 & 4 in November 2013. They qualified the maximum number of starting places with 3 for each gender in each distance (500m, 1000m, & 1500m) and both a men's and women's relay team.

China was hot favorites to win most of the gold medals from the women in the short-track speed skating, including in the 500m, 1000m, & 3000m women's relay. However reigning three-time Olympic gold medalist from Vancouver Wang Meng, broke her ankle during a crash during ice training on January 15, 2014, and did not compete in the Olympics. This was a big blow to the medal chances for China, and had an emotional impact on the team with only a month remaining before Sochi. China was handed another blow with a disqualification from the women's 3000m relay final at Sochi, after impeding on the last lap, giving arch rival Korea the gold medal. Korea was handed the same disqualification in Vancouver that gave China the gold medal four years earlier. Fan Kexin was set to win the 500m after Wang Meng's injury. However, again fell during the semi's. However, China picked up surprise wins in the 500m from Li Jianrou, and 1500m from Zhou Yang. The men also came away with un-predicted medals.

Men

Women

Qualification legend: ADV – Advanced due to being impeded by another skater; FA – Qualify to medal round; FB – Qualify to consolation round

Snowboarding 

Freestyle

Qualification Legend: QF – Qualify directly to final; QS – Qualify to semifinal

Speed skating 

Based on the results from the fall World Cups during the 2013–14 ISU Speed Skating World Cup season, China had earned the following start quotas:

2014 World Sprint Speed Skating Champion Yu Jing missed the Games due to reoccurrence of an old waist injury. Jing was selected to ride the women's 500 m. Deputy Secretary General of the delegation was studying who was going to replace her.

Men

Women

See also
China at the 2014 Summer Youth Olympics
China at the 2014 Winter Paralympics

References

External links 

 
 

Nations at the 2014 Winter Olympics
2014
2014 in Chinese sport